Bezirk Freistadt is a district of the state of 
Upper Austria, in central northern Austria.

Municipalities 
Towns (Städte) are indicated in boldface; market towns (Marktgemeinden) in italics; suburbs, hamlets and other subdivisions of a municipality are indicated in small characters.
Bad Zell
Freistadt
Grünbach
Gutau
Hagenberg im Mühlkreis
Hirschbach im Mühlkreis
Kaltenberg
Kefermarkt
Königswiesen
Lasberg
Leopoldschlag
Liebenau
Neumarkt im Mühlkreis
Pierbach
Pregarten
Rainbach im Mühlkreis
Sandl
Schönau im Mühlkreis
Sankt Leonhard bei Freistadt
Sankt Oswald bei Freistadt
Tragwein
Unterweißenbach
Unterweitersdorf
Waldburg
Wartberg ob der Aist
Weitersfelden
Windhaag bei Freistadt

External links 
Official site

 
Districts of Upper Austria